Olcobhar mac Cummuscach (died 820) was Abbot of Clonfert.

References

 Annals of Ulster at CELT: Corpus of Electronic Texts at University College Cork
 Annals of Tigernach at CELT: Corpus of Electronic Texts at University College Cork
Revised edition of McCarthy's synchronisms at Trinity College Dublin.
 Byrne, Francis John (2001), Irish Kings and High-Kings, Dublin: Four Courts Press, 
 Lysaght, Eamonn (1978), The Surnames of Ireland. , pp. 233–34.

Christian clergy from County Galway
9th-century Irish abbots
820 deaths
Year of birth unknown